The Sick Kitten is a 1903 British short silent comedy film, directed by George Albert Smith, featuring two young children tending to a sick kitten.

Significance 
A remake of the director's now-lost The Little Doctor (1901), The Sick Kitten, according to Michael Brooke of BFI Screenonline, "continues the editing technique that he first explored in Grandma's Reading Glass (1900) and As Seen Through a Telescope (1900)," but, "without the circular black mask to differentiate it," as presumably, "Smith believed that his audience would have grown more sophisticated and would be able to tell the difference between a medium shot and close-up without prompting."

References

External links
 
 
 The Sick Kitten on screenonline.org.uk

1903 films
1900s British films
British black-and-white films
British silent short films
1903 comedy films
1903 short films
Films directed by George Albert Smith
Articles containing video clips
Films about cats
British comedy short films
Silent comedy films